The Creatives is a British sitcom created by Jack Docherty and Moray Hunter which ran for two series between 2 October 1998 and 16 February 2000 on BBC Two. The series starring Roger Allam, Jack Docherty, Moray Hunter, Pippa Guard, Aislín McGuckin, Arabella Weir and Ricky Callan as the titular people.

The Creatives is an advertising agency that has faded from its 1980s heyday. Charlie Baxter is the boss - a one-time whizkid hot shot, now world-weary and seeking solace in liquor and casual sex. The agency's principal creative brains are Ben and Robbie. Robbie is going out with the firm's advertising producer Lauren, and Ben is married to the emotional and insanely jealous Tanya, an Italian who is a secretary at the firm. Max is their film director and Rhona the new assistant - she's a sparky lass who has no qualms about telling her colleagues they're a bunch of has-beens.

The first series followed the ups and downs of the crew as they pitched for and lost various campaigns. The second was considerably different, though, being edgier, darker and more challenging. The agency is thriving once again but Ben is having serious marital problems (we do not see Tanya), Robbie and Lauren seem to have parted, and Rhona has left for pastures new. Episodes revolved more around the private relationships and the concerns of Ben and Robbie than their professional lives, which the writers felt was closer to their original vision. Co-writer and co-star Moray Hunter looked very different, too, having shed four stones since the first series.

Cast
 Roger Allam – Charlie Baxter 
 Jack Docherty – Ben Gray 
 Moray Hunter – Robbie Fraser 
 Pippa Guard – Lauren Marshall
 Ricky Callan – Alan 
 Robert Marley – Max 
 Aislín McGuckin – Rhona Platt (series 1)
 Arabella Weir – Tanya Gray (series 1)
 Fiona Bell – Joanna (series 2)
 Stuart McGuigan – Cameron (series 2)

Episodes

Series overview

Series 1 (1998)

Series 2 (2000)

References

External links

The Creatives at the Phill.co.uk Comedy Guide

1998 British television series debuts
2000 British television series endings
1990s British sitcoms
2000s British sitcoms
BBC television sitcoms
British comedy television shows
English-language television shows
Television series set in the 1980s
Television shows set in London